The Sangha Supreme Council of Thailand (abbreviated SSC) is the governing body of the Buddhist order (Sangha) of Thailand, and is the ultimate authority for all ecclesiastical matters within the Thai Sangha. Its leadership consists of the country's highest ranking monks, who consult the Supreme Patriarch of Thailand with respect to administrative and theological matters. The Sangha Supreme Council was established on 1 January 1963, under the Sangha Act of 1962.

Members of Sangha Supreme Council

President of Sangha Supreme Council
Somdet Phra Ariyavongsagatanana IX (Amborn Ambaro), member of the Dhammayuttika order, abbot of Wat Ratchabophit, bestowed the title of Somdet in 2009, was appointed Supreme Patriarch in 2017.

Councilors from Dhammayuttika Nikaya
 Somdet Phra Dhirañanamuni (Somchai Varajāyo), abbot of Wat Debsirindrawas, bestowed the title of Somdet in 2010.
 Somdet Phra Maha Viravongse (Suchin Aggajino), assistant abbot of Wat Ratchabophit, bestowed the title of Somdet in 2019. 
 Phra Phrom Visuddhacarya (Montri Ganissaro), abbot of Wat Kruea Wan.
 Phra Phrom Muni (Bunroeng Puññajoto), abbot of Wat Phra Si Mahathat.
 Phra Phrom Vajracarya (Phoonsak Varabhaddako), abbot of Wat Ratchapradit.
 Phra Phrom Vajirakara (Sunthon Sundarabho), abbot of Wat Ratchaphatikaram.
 Phra Phrom Vajiramedhi (Amorn Ñāṇodayo), abbot of Wat Pathum Wanaram.
 Phra Dharmavisuddhacarya (Sawaeng Dhammesako), assistant abbot of Wat Bowon Niwet.
 Phra Debañaṇavisidh (Chaithawee Guttacitto), assistant abbot of Wat Pathum Wanaram.

Councilors from Maha Nikaya 
 Somdet Phra Buddhacharya (Sanit Javanapañño), abbot of Wat Traimit, bestowed the title of Somdet in 2014.
 Somdet Phra Maha Dhiracarya (Pasarit Khemaṃkaro), abbot of Wat Yannawa, bestowed the title of Somdet in 2019.
 Somdet Phra Maha Rajjamangalamuni (Thongchai Dhammadhajo), assistant abbot of Wat Traimit, bestowed the title of Somdet in 2019.
 Phra Phrom Moli (Suchat Dhammaratano), assistant abbot of Wat Paknam Bhasicharoen.
 Phra Phrom Pandit (Prayoon Dhammacitto), abbot of Wat Prayurawongsawat
 Phra Phrom Senapati (Phim Ñāṇaviro), abbot of Wat Pathum Khongkha.
 Phra Phrom Kavi (Phongsant Dhammasettho), abbot of Wat Kanlayanamit.
 Phra Phrom Vajiramuni (Choet Cittagutto), abbot of Wat Suthat.
 Phra Dharmavajiramuni (Boonchit Ñāṇasaṃvaro), assistant abbot of Wat Mahathat Yuwaratrangsarit.
 Phra Debagunabhara (Sophon Sobhanacitto), abbot of Wat Thewarat Kunchon.

The Sangha Act in Thailand

The Sangha Administration Act of R.E. 121 (1903 or B.E. 2446)
The Sangha Act of B.E. 2484 (1941) 
The Sangha Act of B.E 2505 (1962)
The Sangha Act of B.E 2535 (1992)
The Sangha Act of B.E 2560 (2017)
The Sangha Act of B.E 2561 (2018)

References

Buddhist organizations based in Thailand
Organizations based in Nakhon Pathom Province
1963 establishments in Thailand
Religious organizations established in 1963